The state of Arkansas is served by three telephone area codes: 479, 501, and 870. In 1947, when the North American Numbering Plan was first implemented, the entire state of Arkansas was assigned the area code 501. With Arkansas being relatively sparsely populated, this arrangement worked well until 1997, when the phone numbers in area code 501 were in danger of being used up. Area code 870 was created in April 1997 to serve the most rural parts of the state (originally specifically not Little Rock metro, Fort Smith or Northwest Arkansas). In January 2002, area code 479 broke from 501, giving Fort Smith and Northwest Arkansas their own area code.

The following three area codes serve Arkansas:

 479, which serves northwestern Arkansas, including Fort Smith and Fayetteville
 501, which serves the Little Rock area and central Arkansas
 870, which serves eastern and southern Arkansas as well as parts of northern Arkansas, including Pine Bluff, Jonesboro, Texarkana, and the Memphis suburbs.

Area code list
 
Arkansas
Area codes